The Baptized World Tour is the third headlining tour by American rock band, Daughtry in support of their fourth studio album Baptized.

Opening acts
The Borderline Saints 
Tahiti 80 
The Ex 
Amsterdamn! 
Charming Liars 
Adam Extra Group 
Drew Bordeaux

Setlist

"Baptized"
"Feels Like Tonight"
"Crawling Back to You"
"Battleships"
"Life After You"
"In the Air Tonight" 
"Traitor"
"Over You"
"No Surprise"
"Wild Heart" 
"Broken Arrows" (Koln only)
"It's Not Over"
"Waiting for Superman"
"September"
"Home"
Encore
"What About Now"
"Long Live Rock & Roll"

Tour dates

Cancellations and rescheduled shows

Box office score data

References

External links

2014 concert tours
Daughtry (band) concert tours